Clair Companies is an entertainment technology company and the umbrella for two brands in the industry: Clair Brothers, a loudspeaker system manufacturer, and Clair Solutions, an AVL (audio, video and lighting) system design and installation company.

History 

Brothers Gene Clair and Roy Clair began providing sound reinforcement services for touring bands beginning in 1966. In 1970, they formed Clair Bros. Audio Enterprises, Inc., which now operates under the name Clair Global. In 1989, the company formed a spin-off, Clair Bros. Audio Systems, Inc., for designing and installing permanent audio systems in various venues, staffing the venture with employees who were not traveling with a live tour. Roy's son, Barry, led this new venture to serve the fixed installation market.

This spin-off division grew and in 2009, moved to a separate location in nearby Manheim, Pennsylvania.

As the installation business grew, the company formed two divisions: one for manufacturing audio equipment and one for installing AVL systems. In August 2014, the company rebranded as Clair Companies, an umbrella for these two divisions. The manufacturing division operates under the shortened trade name Clair Brothers, while the installation division operates under the trade name Clair Solutions.

Clair Brothers 

Clair Brothers manufactures a full line of professional loudspeaker products and systems. Their products include the kiT Series and iSeries.

Clair Solutions 

Clair Solutions designs and installs integrated audio, visual, and lighting systems. Despite being under the same umbrella brand as Clair Brothers, systems installed by Clair Solutions use speakers and other audio equipment manufactured by other brands beside Clair Brothers.

See also 
 Sound reinforcement system
 List of loudspeaker manufacturers
 Coaxial loudspeaker

References

External links 
clairbrothers.com
clairsolutions.com

Loudspeaker manufacturers
Companies established in 1989
Privately held companies based in Pennsylvania
Companies based in Lancaster County, Pennsylvania
Audio equipment manufacturers of the United States